81 Ceti b (abbreviated 81 Cet b) is an extrasolar planet approximately 331 light years away in the constellation of Cetus. It is estimated to be 5.3 times the mass of Jupiter which also makes it a gas giant.  It orbits the G-type giant star 81 Ceti at an average distance of 2.5 AU, taking about 2.6 years to revolve with an eccentricity of 20.6.

Discovery
The preprint announcing this planet was submitted to the arXiv electronic repository on July 2, 2008, by Bun'ei Sato and collaborators, who discovered it using the Doppler Spectroscopy method, during the Okayama Planet Search radial velocity survey of G and K giants at Okayama Astrophysical Observatory.

See also
 14 Andromedae b
 6 Lyncis b
 79 Ceti b
 94 Ceti b

References

External links
 
 

Cetus (constellation)
Giant planets
Exoplanets discovered in 2008
Exoplanets detected by radial velocity